Colecerus is a genus of broad-nosed weevils in the beetle family Curculionidae. There are about nine described species in Colecerus.

Species
These nine species belong to the genus Colecerus:
 Colecerus albidus Chevrolat, 1881 c g
 Colecerus crassipes Champion, 1911 c g
 Colecerus denticollis Champion, 1911 c g
 Colecerus dispar (LeConte, 1874) i c g b
 Colecerus marmoratus (Horn, 1876) i c g b (Texas marbled weevil)
 Colecerus rotundicollis Champion, 1911 c g
 Colecerus setosus Boheman, 1840 c g
 Colecerus variegatus Boheman, 1845 c g
 Colecerus virescens Champion, 1911 c g
Data sources: i = ITIS, c = Catalogue of Life, g = GBIF, b = Bugguide.net

References

Further reading

 
 
 
 

Entiminae
Articles created by Qbugbot